The al-Majalah camp attack also referred to as the al-Majalah massacre occurred on December 17, 2009 when the United States military launched Tomahawk cruise missiles from a ship off the Yemeni coast on a Bedouin camp in the southern village of Al-Maʽjalah in Yemen, killing 14 alleged Al-Qaeda in the Arabian Peninsula fighters and 41 civilians, including 14 women and 21 children.

The attack
The al-Majalah camp attack took place on December 17, 2009, when United States launched cruise missiles at the site. Initially, both the U.S. and Yemeni governments denied U.S. involvement in the strikes, despite accusations from Amnesty International. Several months after the attack in Al Majalah, Amnesty International released photos showing an American cluster bomb and a propulsion unit from a Tomahawk cruise missile. A subsequent inquiry by the Yemeni parliament found that fourteen Al Qaeda fighters had been killed—along with forty-one civilians, including twenty-three children.

A primary target in the attacks — Qasim al-Raymi, is suspected of or has taken credit for several attacks that killed many civilians and has threatened more attacks on the United States. For example, he is the al-Qaeda leader who was believed to be behind the 2007 Marib suicide car bombing, that killed seven Spanish tourists and two Yemenis — survived the attack.

In media
 Dirty Wars, a 2013 American documentary directed by Richard Rowley, and written by Jeremy Scahill and David Riker.

See also
 Abdulelah Haider Shaye, a prominent Yemeni journalist who was jailed after reporting US involvement in the attack.

References

Conflicts in 2009
Mass murder in 2009
Battles involving Yemen
2009 in Yemen
Abyan Governorate
Military operations involving Yemen
December 2009 events in Asia
Massacres in 2009